1991 is the debut EP of Babyland, released in January 1991 by Flipside.

Track listing

Personnel
Adapted from the Babyland liner notes.

Babyland
 Dan Gatto – lead vocals, keyboards
 Michael Smith – percussion

Production and design
 Andrew Growcott (as Stoker) – recording, engineering
 John Wizner – cover art, illustrations, photography

Release history

References

External links 
 1991 at Discogs (list of releases)

1991 debut EPs
Babyland albums
Flipside (fanzine) albums